Zylon (IUPAC name: poly(p-phenylene-2,6-benzobisoxazole)) is a trademarked name for a range of thermoset liquid-crystalline polyoxazole. This synthetic polymer material was invented and developed by SRI International in the 1980s and manufactured by Toyobo. In generic usage, the fiber is referred to as PBO.

Zylon has 5.8 GPa of tensile strength, which is 1.6 times that of Kevlar. Additionally Zylon has a high Young's modulus of 270 GPa, meaning that it is stiffer than steel. Like Kevlar, Zylon is used in a number of applications that require very high strength with excellent thermal stability. Tennis racquets, table-tennis blades, snowboards, various medical applications, and some of the Martian rovers are some of the better-known instances.

Usage

Body armor 
Zylon gained wide use in U.S. police officers body armor protection in 1998 with its introduction by Second Chance Body Armor, Inc. in its "Ultima" and "Ultimax" protective vests. Protective vests constructed with Zylon were questioned in late 2003 when Oceanside, CA Police Officer Tony Zeppetella's and Forest Hills, PA Police Officer Ed Limbacher's vests both failed, leaving Zeppetella mortally wounded and Limbacher seriously injured. Some studies subsequently reported that the Zylon vests might degrade over time and leave their wearers with less protection than expected. Second Chance eventually recalled all of its Zylon vests, which led to its bankruptcy. In early 2005, Armor Holdings, Inc. recalled its Zylon-based products, and decreased the rated lifespan warranty of new vests from 60 months to 30 months. In August 2005, AHI decided to discontinue manufacturing all of its Zylon-containing vests. This was largely based on the actions of the U.S. government's National Institute of Justice, which decertified Zylon for use in its approved models of ballistic vests for law enforcement. 

The United States Justice Department launched numerous investigations into possible violations of the False Claims Act regarding the defective vests. Throughout the course of litigation, settlements totaling more than $136 million were reached with 18 entities involved in the production and sale of Zylon vests. The investigations concluded after nearly two decades when the final settlement was obtained with material supplier Honeywell International in late 2022.

Space elevator research 
A competition was held in the Wirefly X Prize Cup in Las Cruces, New Mexico, US, on October 20–21, 2006. A team from the University of British Columbia entered into the Tether Challenge, using a construction made from Zylon fibers. The house tether used by Spaceward, that the other teams would have to beat in strength by 50% in the 2007 Spaceward games, was made of Zylon.

High-altitude balloon science 
Zylon is used by NASA in long-duration, high-altitude data collection. Braided Zylon strands maintain the structure of polyethylene superpressure balloons. Zylon is the material of choice due to its low weight, high tensile strength, and thermal properties.

Motorsport 
Since 2001 Zylon tethers are used in Formula One to attach the wheels to the chassis, thus preventing the wheel from ejecting into a crowded area in the event of an accident which causes the wheel to become airborne. Starting in the 2007 season, the driver's cockpit must now be clad in special anti-penetration panels made of Zylon. In 2011, a Zylon strip was introduced to reinforce the top of the racing helmet visor and provide an overlap between the visor and helmet for additional protection after Felipe Massa's 2009 injury. The Indy Racing League began using Zylon in 2008.

Standing rigging 
On modern racing yachts, Zylon is used for parts of the standing rigging. It is used as shrouds and stays. The PBO (polybenzoxazole) fiber is degraded by UV light, seawater, and chafing (the problem that caused Zylon to be removed from usage in protective vests for police usage, as shown above), and is therefore protected by a synthetic melted-on jacket. It is claimed to be 65% lighter than traditional rigging at 110–130% of the price of rod rigging. Based on laboratory tests, superior durability is also claimed.

Parachutes 
SpaceX uses Zylon for the suspension lines on their Mk3 parachutes. The four Mk3 parachutes are used on SpaceX's human-rated Crew Dragon spacecraft.

Conductive textile 
Zylon has been incorporated as the base fiber for some conductive textiles, where the Zylon fiber is plated with nickel, copper, silver, or gold. The conductive fiber is used for electronic textiles, EMI shielding in woven or knit sheets, or as a braid over wires, and for signal transmission or current conduction. This conductive fiber combines the advantages of Zylon (strength, resistance to high temperatures, durability, lightweight, etc.) with the electrical properties of various metals. The conductive yarns can be sewn, braided, knit, or simply insulated like a bare wire.

Structural rehabilitation 
PBO is the strongest and stiffest of commercially available fibers used to repair and strengthen concrete and masonry structures in externally bonded composite systems. In this system, the fibers are produced in the form of a fabric mesh, and a cementitious mortar matrix bonds this to an existing structure.

Loudspeakers 
Yamaha uses Zylon to make the speaker cones for its top-of-the-line NS-5000 speaker.

See also 
Synthetic fiber
Aramid
Technora
Twaron
Dyneema
Vectran

References

External links 
 Zylon manufacturer Toyobo
 Zylon in body armor

Body armor
Polyurethanes
Synthetic fibers
Products introduced in 1998
SRI International